The Opéra Orchestre national Montpellier is a French orchestra founded in 2001 and associated with the Opéra national de Montpellier in Languedoc-Roussillon.  The orchestra and opera are also associated with the Festival de Radio France et Montpellier created in 1985 by René Koering.  The orchestra's current general director is Valérie Chevalier, since December 2013.

The orchestra's principal conductor is Michael Schønwandt, since September 2015.  His initial contract with the orchestra is through June 2018.

Music directors
 Gianfranco Masini (1992–1993)
 Friedemann Layer (1994–2007)
 Lawrence Foster (2009–2012)
 Michael Schønwandt (2015–present)

References

External links

 Official French-language homepage of the Orchestre national Montpellier Languedoc-Roussillon

French orchestras
2001 establishments in France
Musical groups established in 2001
Languedoc-Roussillon
Organizations based in Montpellier
Musical groups from Occitania (administrative region)